Biharamulo Forest Reserve is a protected area in Tanzania. It was established in 1954. This site is 1462.32 km.

It is located in Biharamulo District, Kagera Region, not far from Biharamulo town. Lake Victoria lies at the North Eastern corner of the park.

During the rainy season, which lasts from January to April, a large number of bird watchers from all over the world gather. The most common bird species in this area are Martial Eagle, Sacred Ibis, Saddles, and Billed Stork.

References

Protected areas of Tanzania
Protected areas established in 1959
1954 establishments in Tanganyika
Geography of Kagera Region